Sławomir Piotr Rybicki (born 23 June 1960 in Gdańsk) is a Polish politician. He was elected to the Sejm on 25 September 2005, getting 12557 votes in 35 Olsztyn district as a candidate from the Civic Platform list.

He was also a member of Sejm 2001-2005.

See also
Members of Polish Sejm 2005-2007

External links
Sławomir Rybicki - parliamentary page - includes declarations of interest, voting record, and transcripts of speeches.

Members of the Polish Sejm 2005–2007
Members of the Polish Sejm 2001–2005
Members of the Polish Sejm 2007–2011
Members of the Polish Sejm 2011–2015
Members of the Senate of Poland 2015–2019
Members of the Senate of Poland 2019–2023
Civic Platform politicians
1960 births
Living people
Politicians from Gdańsk
Recipient of the Meritorious Activist of Culture badge